Hanoch Zeibert (born 1960) is an Israeli rabbi, politician and Former (fifteen) mayor of the Israeli city of Bnei Brak.

Biography
Zeibert was born in Bnei Brak to Gur Hasidic parents. Upon his Marriage he moved to Ashdod.
Since 2009 Zeibert lives in Bnei Brak and married with twelve children.

Zeibert served as Deputy Mayor from the United Torah Judaism and Chairman of the Subcommittee for Planning and Construction. When the Illegal African immigrants are settled in Neighbourhood of Pardes Katz, Deputy Mayor Zeibert and the Members of the Bnei Brak City Council, convened in November 21, 2010 with top activists in the struggle in order to find ways to deal with the phenomenon. In 2013 elections he ran for the "Central Torah list" party, won the support of all the ultra-Orthodox parties overwhelmingly elected mayor of Bnei Brak with approximately 94% of votes.

References

External links 
 Hanoch Zeibert  Bnei Brak Municipality 

1960 births
Living people
21st-century Israeli politicians
Agudat Yisrael politicians
Deputy mayors of places in Israel
Israeli Hasidic rabbis
Jewish Israeli politicians
Mayors of places in Israel
Rabbis in Bnei Brak
United Torah Judaism politicians